What Every Woman Knows is a 1917 British comedy drama film directed by Fred W. Durrant and starring Hilda Trevelyan, Madge Tree and Maud Yates. It is an adaptation of the 1908 play What Every Woman Knows by J.M. Barrie. American versions were filmed in 1921 and 1934.

Premise
A young Scottish woman has an arranged marriage with a rising politician and becomes the secret behind his success. However their relationship is threatened by the arrival of a glamorous English socialite who threatens to steal her husband away.

Partial cast
 Hilda Trevelyan - Maggie Wylie
 Maud Yates - The Comtesse
 Madge Tree - Mother
 A.B. Imeson

References

External links

1917 films
1917 comedy-drama films
British comedy-drama films
British films based on plays
Films based on works by J. M. Barrie
British silent feature films
Films set in London
British black-and-white films
1910s English-language films
1910s British films
Silent comedy-drama films